Hsieh Su-wei and Barbora Strýcová were the defending champions but chose not to participate.

Nicole Melichar and Demi Schuurs won the title, defeating Monica Niculescu and Jeļena Ostapenko in the final, 6–2, 2–6, [10–8].

Seeds

Draw

Draw

References

External Links
Main Draw

2021 WTA Tour
2021 Qatar Total Open – Doubles